AM:PM is the third album by Italian post-hardcore band Dufresne. It was released May 14, 2010.

The album was recorded in Vicenza, Italy at Raptor Recording Studio, owned by bassist Matteo "Ciube" Tabacco, and produced by British producer Matt Hyde.

Track listing

Credits 
 Nicola "Dominik" Cerantola - lead vocals
 Matteo "Ciube" Tabacco - bass, backup vocals
 Luca Dal Lago - guitar
 Alessandro Costa - keyboards
 Davide Zenorini - drums

References 

Wynona Records albums
2010 albums
Dufresne (band) albums
Italian-language albums